"Your Unchanging Love" is a 1967 single released by American soul singer Marvin Gaye on the Tamla label.

Overview
Written by Holland–Dozier–Holland, the song was featured on Marvin's Moods of Marvin Gaye album. Released during a time when Gaye was releasing hit duets by Kim Weston and Tammi Terrell, this was a rare solo detour that was successful enough to garner a top 40 pop charting where it peaked at number 33 on the Billboard Hot 100 making it the fourth top forty single issued from Moods.

Cash Box called it "a light, pulsing, medium-paced R&B romp that should see plenty of spins and sales."

The song was musically conceived on the same musical background as Marvin's landmark single, "How Sweet It Is (To Be Loved By You)", and performed better chart-wise than their previous single, "Little Darling (I Need You)".

Track listing

Personnel
Lead vocals – Marvin Gaye
Background vocals – The Andantes
Instrumentation – The Funk Brothers

References

1967 singles
Marvin Gaye songs
Songs written by Holland–Dozier–Holland
Tamla Records singles
1967 songs
Song recordings produced by Lamont Dozier
Song recordings produced by Brian Holland